Lila, officially the Municipality of Lila,  is a 5th class municipality in the province of Bohol, Philippines. According to the 2020 census, it has a population of 12,240 people.

 from Tagbilaran, it is bound to the east by Dimiao, to the west by Loay and to the north by Loboc.

The town of Lila, Bohol celebrates its fiesta on October 7, to honor the town patron the Holy Rosary.

History

The coastal town of Lila once belonged to the Municipality of Dimiao. It was composed of the barrios of the municipalities of Loay and Dimiao. In 1899, during the Spanish–American War, the municipal building, the church and neighboring houses were razed to the ground and burned. Thus, no records can be shown stating when Lila was annexed to the town of Dimiao. However, the Augustinian mission in Bohol has written that Lila was a separate municipality in 1879, with a population of 4,023.

Later, a town was founded and part of the municipality was annexed back to Loay and part to Dimiao. From that time up to 1914, the municipal government of Lila ceased to function.

However, in 1915 the municipality of Lila was re-established, with Celestino Oculam as Mayor. That part of Lila annexed to Dimiao and those annexed to Loay were returned and formed the new municipality of Lila.

For the church, it was initially administered alternately by a priest stationed in Loay and Dimiao due to the scarcity of priests. It was only in 1921 that the priest of Lila had a residential parish. The church and the convent built then were only made of light materials.

In 1915, during the administration of Fr. Narciso Maglasang, the present church was built. The convent was constructed under the administration of Fr. Miguel Ortega some time in the year 1941.

After World War II, the town prospered.

Geography

Barangays
Lila comprises 18 barangays, of which 10 are coastal and 8 inland:

Climate

Demographics

Economy

Gallery

References

External links
 [ Philippine Standard Geographic Code]
Lila
History of Lila
Municipality of Lila

Municipalities of Bohol